The 1968 Army Cadets football team represented the United States Military Academy in the 1968 NCAA University Division football season. In their third year under head coach Tom Cahill, the Cadets compiled a 7–3 record and outscored their opponents by a combined total of 270 to 137.  In the annual Army–Navy Game, the Cadets defeated the Midshipmen by a 21 to 14 score. The Cadets lost to Vanderbilt by a 17 to 13 score, Penn State by 28 to 24, and to Missouri by a 7 to 3 score. 
 
Army linebacker Ken Johnson was selected by the American Football Coaches Association as a first-team player on the 1968 College Football All-America Team.

Schedule

Personnel

Season summary

The Citadel

Vanderbilt

at Missouri

California

at Rutgers

Duke

at Penn State

Boston College

at Pittsburgh

vs Navy

References

Army
Army Black Knights football seasons
Army Cadets football